Muhammad Razie Abdul Rahim (born 25 August 1987) is a Malaysian field hockey player who plays as a defender. He is known as the penalty corner specialist.

Personal life
He holds a Masters in Human Resource Management at University Putra Malaysia. In 2016, he reported as one of the Royal Malaysian Police (PDRM) trainers.

Career
Razie made his debut in the Malaysia Hockey League in 2006 for Ernst and Young (Kuala Lumpur Hockey Club). He emerged as the league top scorer in 2011 season. In the 2019 Malaysia Hockey League, he played for UniKL.

Razie made his senior international debut in the 2006 Sultan Azlan Shah Cup.

References

External links

1987 births
Living people
Malaysian people of Malay descent
Malaysian male field hockey players
Malaysian police officers
Asian Games medalists in field hockey
Field hockey players at the 2006 Asian Games
Field hockey players at the 2010 Asian Games
Field hockey players at the 2014 Asian Games
2014 Men's Hockey World Cup players
Field hockey players at the 2018 Asian Games
2018 Men's Hockey World Cup players
Asian Games silver medalists for Malaysia
Medalists at the 2010 Asian Games
Medalists at the 2018 Asian Games
Male field hockey defenders
Southeast Asian Games gold medalists for Malaysia
Southeast Asian Games medalists in field hockey
Field hockey players at the 2010 Commonwealth Games
Field hockey players at the 2014 Commonwealth Games
Field hockey players at the 2018 Commonwealth Games
Competitors at the 2017 Southeast Asian Games
Commonwealth Games bronze medallists for Malaysia
Field hockey players at the 2006 Commonwealth Games
Commonwealth Games medallists in field hockey
2023 Men's FIH Hockey World Cup players
Medallists at the 2006 Commonwealth Games